Syliphone was a Guinean record label which ran from 1967 until 1984. The label was based in Conakry, Guinea. Created and funded by the Guinean government, Syliphone was the first African record label to attain funding from the state within the post-colonial era. The music on the label has been described as representing "some of the most sublime and influential that any West African nation has ever produced." The dissolution of Syliphone came with the death of the first president of Guinea, Ahmed Sékou Touré in 1984.

Context and Origins 

On 28 September 1958, Guineans voted in a constitutional referendum on whether to adopt Charles de Gaulle's French Constitution of 1958, which proposed the formation of a new French Community. Over 95% of the votes were against the constitution. On 2 October 1958 Guinea became an independent nation, making it the first of the French colonies to attain independence.

With the new found independence, the elected Guinean government headed by president Ahmed Sékou Touré to instil a sense of national identity by reigniting the arts and cultural practices of Guinea. Central to fulfilling these aims was the government's cultural policy of authenticité, which saw the creation of a network of arts troupes across the nation. These troupes, choirs, ensembles and orchestras, who numbered over 250, provided a comprehensive representation of Guinean musical styles and approaches. Guinean musicians were encouraged to create modern versions of the traditional songs of their respective regions  and the authenticité policy produced many outstanding recordings. It influenced musical development and originality outside of Guinea, too, with Mali Burkina and Faso adopting similar programs in the creation of their regional and national arts troupes and orchestras. Formed in 1967, the Syliphone label became the central distributor of Guinean music, making it accessible to the general public across West Africa, and thus shaping the sound of African popular music from the 1960s to the 1980s and beyond.

Musical Style 

In the early period of the label, modern orchestras were at the forefront of Syliphone and subsequently the authenticité cultural policy. Traditional songs were given a modern twist with the use of electric guitars and saxophones in replacement of the kora (instrument) and balafon. In the 1970s, the experimentation and creative approaches within the Syliphone sound developed and came of age. Musicians on the label began to tour Africa, Europe and USA, which gave Syliphone and the authenticité cultural policy international recognition and an international audience. Into the 1980s, Syliphone had released recordings of choirs, ensembles and solo artists on the label.

Graeme Counsel describes what made Syliphone stand out from other post-colonial African record labels: "A lot of care had gone into their production: the cover art was high quality glossy colour; the lyrics of the songs were often provided; the musicians were named; and lengthy annotations providing a musicological analysis were featured on many of the back covers. Another remarkable feature was the excellent quality of the audio. The sound engineer’s positioning of the microphones, the subtle use of echo effects, and the fidelity of the production were of the most exceptional standard when compared with recordings of a similar type. Such high quality audio captured Guinea’s musicians at their best, and they clearly rivalled, if not surpassed, the great singers and groups from neighbouring Mali and Senegal."

The Syliphone Archive 

In 2016, the entire Syliphone Archive was made available through The British Library. The Endangered Archives Programme facilitated the project and it was the first online sound initiative of the programme. The archive contains every release on the Syliphone label but also over 7,000 songs recorded in Guinea in the same studios and with the same engineers as Syliphone. From 2008 to 2013, the project holder Graeme Counsel oversaw the preservation and digitisation of Syliphone vinyl recordings and reel-to-reel tapes for the archive. The degradation threats and previous neglect of these two formats meant that the digitisation process was essential to preserve the recordings. Other threats to the archive were more overt, with Graeme Counsel noting that “the government’s own archive of this collection was partially destroyed in the counter-coup of 1985, when artillery bombed the national broadcaster and home of the offices of the RTG."

Recordings in the collection can be listened to by all.

Notable Artists 

Balla et ses Balladins
Bembeya Jazz National
Bongi Makeba
Franklin Boukaka
Keletigui et ses Tambourinis
Sory Kandia Kouyaté
Les Ballets Africains
Miriam Makeba
Kébendo Jazz
Les Amazones de Guinée
Super Boiro Band

References

External links 

Syliphone record label recordings: Syliphone record label recordings from Guinea - World and traditional music | British Library - Sounds

The Syliphone discography: 

Guinean music
African record labels
African popular music